A Scott Russell linkage is a linkage which translates linear motion through a right angle. 

The linkage is named after John Scott Russell (1808–1882), although watchmaker William Freemantle had already patented it in 1803.

A different form of the linkage has been used in a front-wheel-drive vehicle with solid rear axle to control lateral movement, and with a flexing elastomeric connection instead of the rolling or sliding connection.

The linkage does not share the disadvantages of the asymmetric Panhard rod, and although more compact than Watt's linkage, it has all the forces concentrated in one link.

Construction and related linkages

The linkage is composed of two links. One link is double the size of the other, and is connected to the smaller link by its midpoint.

One of the ends is then connected to something that can generate linear motion, such as a rolling or sliding connection, or another straight line mechanism.

The Evans 'grasshopper' linkage is a variant of a Scott Russell linkage which uses a long link to create a large enough arc to approximate a line. 

The Bricard inversor directly incorporates the Scott Russell's links, replacing the previously required straight line connection and allowing for two exact straight line outputs at right angles. 

If both ends are turned into sliding connections, you get a Trammel of Archimedes.

References

External links

 Animation of a Scott-Russell linkage in action

Automotive suspension technologies
Linkages (mechanical)

Straight line mechanisms